The Asian elephant (Elephas maximus), also known as the Asiatic elephant, is the only living species of the genus Elephas and is distributed throughout the Indian subcontinent and Southeast Asia, from India in the west, Nepal in the north, Sumatra in the south, and to Borneo in the east. Three subspecies are recognised—E. m. maximus from Sri Lanka, E. m. indicus from mainland Asia and E. m. sumatranus from the island of Sumatra. Formerly, there was also the Syrian elephant or Western Asiatic elephant (Elephas maximus asurus) which was the westernmost population of the Asian elephant (Elephas maximus). This subspecies became extinct in ancient times. Skeletal remains of E. m. asurus have been recorded from the Middle East: Iran, Iraq, Syria, and Turkey from periods dating between at least 1800 BC and likely 700 BC. It is one of only three living species of elephants or elephantids anywhere in the world, the others being the African bush elephant and African forest elephant. It is the second largest species of elephant after the African bush elephant.

The Asian elephant is the largest living land animal in Asia. Since 1986, the Asian elephant has been listed as Endangered on the IUCN Red List, as the population has declined by at least 50 percent over the last three elephant generations, which is about 60–75 years. It is primarily threatened by loss of habitat, habitat degradation, fragmentation and poaching. In 2019, the wild population was estimated at 48,323–51,680 individuals.  Female captive elephants have lived beyond 60 years when kept in semi-natural surroundings, such as forest camps. In zoos, Asian elephants die at a much younger age; captive populations are declining due to a low birth and high death rate.

The genus Elephas originated in Sub-Saharan Africa during the Pliocene and spread throughout Africa before expanding into the southern half of Asia. The earliest indications of captive use of Asian elephants are engravings on seals of the Indus Valley civilisation dated to the 3rd millennium BC.

Taxonomy 

Carl Linnaeus proposed the scientific name Elephas maximus in 1758 for an elephant from Ceylon. Elephas indicus was proposed by Georges Cuvier in 1798, who described an elephant from India. Coenraad Jacob Temminck named an elephant from Sumatra Elephas sumatranus in 1847. Frederick Nutter Chasen classified all three as subspecies of the Asian elephant in 1940. These three subspecies are currently recognised as valid taxa. Results of phylogeographic and morphological analyses indicate that the Sri Lankan and Indian elephants are not distinct enough to warrant classification as separate subspecies.

Elephas maximus borneensis was proposed by Paules Edward Pieris Deraniyagala in 1950 who described an elephant in an illustration published in the National Geographic magazine, but not a living elephant in accordance with the rules of the International Code of Zoological Nomenclature. The Asian elephants living in northern Borneo are smaller than all the other subspecies, but with larger ears, a longer tail, and straight tusks. Results of genetic analysis indicate that their ancestors separated from the mainland population about 300,000 years ago.

The following Asian elephants were proposed as extinct subspecies, but are now considered synonymous with the Indian elephant:
 Syrian elephant (E. m. asurus), proposed by Deraniyagala in 1950, was based on Bronze Age illustrations.
 Chinese elephant (E. m. rubridens), also proposed by Deraniyagala in 1950, was based on a bronze statuette of an elephant.
 Javan elephant (E. m. sondaicus), also proposed by Deraniyagala in 1950, was an illustration of a carving on the Buddhist monument of Borobudur.

Characteristics 

In general, the Asian elephant is smaller than the African bush elephant and has the highest body point on the head. The back is convex or level. The ears are small with dorsal borders folded laterally. It has up to 20 pairs of ribs and 34 caudal vertebrae. The feet have more nail-like structures than those of African elephants—five on each forefoot, and four on each hind foot. The forehead has two hemispherical bulges, unlike the flat front of the African elephants.

Size
Sexual dimorphism in body size is relatively less pronounced in Asian elephants than in African bush elephants; with bulls averaging 15% and 23% taller in the former and latter respectively.

Trunk 

The distinctive trunk is an elongation of the nose and upper lip combined; the nostrils are at its tip, which has one finger-like process. The trunk contains as many as 60,000 muscles, which consist of longitudinal and radiating sets. The longitudinals are mostly superficial and subdivided into anterior, lateral, and posterior. The deeper muscles are best seen as numerous distinct fasciculi in a cross-section of the trunk. The trunk is a multipurpose prehensile organ and highly sensitive, innervated by the maxillary division of the trigeminal nerve and by the facial nerve. The acute sense of smell uses both the trunk and Jacobson's organ. Elephants use their trunks for breathing, watering, feeding, touching, dusting, sound production and communication, washing, pinching, grasping, defence and offence.

The "proboscis" or trunk consists wholly of muscular and membranous tissue, and is a tapering muscular structure of nearly circular cross-section extending proximally from the attachment at the anterior nasal orifice, and ending distally in a tip or finger. Muscular and tendinous ability combined with nervous control allows extraordinary strength and agility movements of the trunk, such as sucking and spraying of water or dust and directed airflow blowing.

The trunk can hold about four litres of water. Elephants will playfully wrestle with each other using their trunks, but generally use their trunks only for gesturing when fighting.

Tusks 

Tusks serve to dig for water, salt, and rocks, to debark and uproot trees, as levers for maneuvering fallen trees and branches, for work, for display, for marking trees, as a weapon for offence and defence, as trunk-rests, and as protection for the trunk. Elephants are known to be right or left tusked.

Cows usually lack tusks; if tusks—in that case, called "tushes"—are present, they are barely visible and only seen when the mouth is open. The enamel plates of the molars are greater in number and closer together in Asian elephants. Some bulls may also lack tusks; these individuals are called "filsy makhnas", and are especially common among the Sri Lankan elephant population.

Skin 

Skin colour is usually grey, and may be masked by soil because of dusting and wallowing. Their wrinkled skin is movable and contains many nerve centres. It is smoother than that of African elephants and may be depigmented on the trunk, ears, or neck. Its folds increase surface area for heat dissipation. They can tolerate cold better than excessive heat. Body temperature averages .

Intelligence

Asian elephants have a very large and highly developed neocortex, a trait also shared by humans, apes and certain dolphin species. They have a greater volume of cerebral cortex available for cognitive processing than all other existing land animals. Results of studies indicate that Asian elephants have cognitive abilities for tool use and tool-making similar to great apes. They exhibit a wide variety of behaviours, including those associated with grief, learning, allomothering, mimicry, play, altruism, use of tools, compassion, cooperation, self-awareness, memory, and language. Elephants reportedly head to safer ground during natural disasters like tsunamis and earthquakes, but data from two satellite-collared Sri Lankan elephants indicate this may be untrue.

Several students of elephant cognition and neuroanatomy are convinced that Asian elephants are highly intelligent and self-aware. Others contest this view.

Distribution and habitat 

Asian elephants inhabit grasslands, tropical evergreen forests, semi-evergreen forests, moist deciduous forests, dry deciduous forests and dry thorn forests, in addition to cultivated and secondary forests and scrublands. In the eastern Himalaya in northeast India, they regularly move up above  in summer at a few sites.

In China, the Asian elephant survives only in the prefectures of Xishuangbanna, Simao, and Lincang of southern Yunnan. Estimated population is around 300 individual (in 2020).

In Bangladesh, some isolated populations survive in the south-east Chittagong Hills. A herd of 20–25 wild elephants was reported as being present in the Garo Hills of Mymensingh in the late-1990s, being detached from a big herd in the Peack hills of India and prevented from returning by fences put up in the meantime by the Indian border security force. The herd was estimated at about 60 individuals in 2014.

Three subspecies are recognised:
 the Sri Lankan elephant occurs in Sri Lanka;
 the Indian elephant occurs in mainland Asia: Bangladesh, Bhutan, Cambodia, China, India, Laos, Malay Peninsula, Myanmar, Nepal, Thailand, Vietnam;
 the Sumatran elephant occurs in Sumatra.

A fourth potential subspecies, the Borneo elephant, occurs in Borneo's northeastern parts, primarily in Sabah (Malaysia), and sometimes in Kalimantan (Indonesia). In 2003, mitochondrial DNA analysis and microsatellite data indicated that the Borneo elephant population is derived from stock that originated in the region of the Sunda Islands. The genetic divergence of Borneo elephants warrants their recognition as a separate Evolutionarily Significant Unit.

Ecology and behaviour

Asian elephants are crepuscular. They are generalist feeders, and are both grazers and browsers. They are known to feed on at least 112 different plant species, most commonly of the order Malvales, as well as the legume, palm, sedge and true grass families. They browse more in the dry season with bark constituting a major part of their diet in the cool part of that season. They drink at least once a day and are never far from a permanent source of fresh water. They need 80–200 litres of water a day and use even more for bathing. At times, they scrape the soil for clay or minerals.

Cows and calves move about together as groups, while bulls disperse from their mothers upon reaching adolescence. Bulls are solitary or form temporary "bachelor groups". Cow-calf units generally tend to be small, typically consisting of three adults (most likely related females) and their offspring. Larger groups of as many as 15 adult females have also been recorded. Seasonal aggregations of 17 individuals including calves and young adults have been observed in Sri Lanka's Uda Walawe National Park. Until recently, Asian elephants, like African elephants, were thought to be under the leadership of older adult females, or matriarchs. It is now recognized that cows form extensive and very fluid social networks, with varying degrees of associations between individuals. Social ties generally tend to be weaker than in African elephants.

Unlike African elephants, which rarely use their forefeet for anything other than digging or scraping soil, Asian elephants are more agile at using their feet in conjunction with the trunk for manipulating objects. They can sometimes be known for their violent behavior.

Asian elephants are recorded to make three basic sounds: growls, squeaks and snorts. Growls in their basic form are used for short distance communication. During mild arousal, growls resonate in the trunk and become rumbles while for long-distance communication, they escalate into roars. Low-frequency growls are infrasonic and made in many contexts. Squeaks come in two forms; chirpings and trumpets. Chirping consists of multiple short squeaks and signal conflict and nervousness. Trumpets are lengthened squeaks with increased loudness and produced during extreme arousal. Snorts signal changes in activity and increase in loudness during mild or strong arousal. During the latter case, when an elephant bounces the tip of the trunk it creates booms which serve as threat displays. Elephants are able to distinguish low-amplitude sounds.

Rarely, tigers have been recorded attacking and killing calves, especially if the calves become separated from their mothers, stranded from their herd, or orphaned. Adults are largely invulnerable to natural predation. There is a singular anecdotal case of a mother Asian elephant allegedly being killed alongside her calf; however, this account is contestable. In 2011 and 2014, two instances were recorded of tigers successfully killing adult elephants; one by a single tiger in Jim Corbett National Park on a 20-year-old elephant, and another on a 28-year-old elephant in Kaziranga National Park further east, which was taken down and eaten by several tigers hunting cooperatively. Elephants appear to distinguish between the growls of larger predators like tigers and smaller predators like leopards; they react to leopards less fearfully and more aggressively.

Reproduction 
Reproduction in Asian elephants can be attributed to the production and perception of signaling compounds called pheromones. These signals are transmitted through various bodily fluids. They are commonly released in urine but in males they are also found in special secretions from the temporal glands. Once integrated and perceived, these signals provide the receiver with information about the reproductive status of the sender. If both parties are ready to breed, reproductive ritualic behavior occurs and the process of sexual reproduction proceeds.
Bulls will fight one another to get access to oestrus cows. Strong fights over access to females are extremely rare. Bulls reach sexual maturity around the age of 12–15. Between the age of 10 and 20 years, bulls undergo an annual phenomenon known as "musth". This is a period where the testosterone level is up to 100 times greater than non-musth periods, and they become aggressive. Secretions containing pheromones occur during this period, from the paired temporal glands located on the head between the lateral edge of the eye and the base of the ear. The aggressive behaviors observed during musth can be attributed to varying amounts of frontalin (1,5-dimethyl-6,8-dioxabicyclo[3.2.1]octane) throughout the maturation process of bulls. Frontalin is a pheromone that was first isolated in bark beetles but can also be produced in the bulls of both Asian and African Elephants.The compound can be excreted through urine as well as through the temporal glands of the bull allowing signaling to occur. During musth, increased concentrations of frontalin in the bull's urine communicate the reproductive status of the bull to female elephants.

Similar to other mammals, hormone secretion in female elephants is regulated by an estrous cycle. This cycle is regulated by surges in Luteinizing Hormone that are observed 3 weeks from each other. This type of estrous cycle has also been observed in African Elephants but not known to affect other mammals. The first surge in Luteinizing Hormone is not followed by the release of an egg from the ovaries. However, some female elephants still exhibit the expected mating protocols during this surge. Female elephants give ovulatory cues by utilizing sex pheromones. A principal component thereof, (Z)-7-dodecen-1-yl acetate, has also been found to be a sex pheromone in numerous species of insects. In both insects and elephants, this chemical compound is used as an attractant to assist the mating process. In elephants, the chemical is secreted through urination and this aids in the attraction of bulls to mate. Once detected, the chemical stimulates the vomeronasal organ of the bull thus providing information on the maturity of the female.

Reproductive signaling exchange between male and female elephants are transmitted through olfactory cues in bodily fluids. In males, the increase in frontalin during musth heightens their sensitivity to the (Z)-7-dodecen-1-yl acetate produced by female elephants. Once perceived by receptors in the trunk, a sequence of ritualistic behaviors follow. The responses in males vary based on both the stage of development and the temperament of the elephant. This process of receiving and processing signals through the trunk is referred to as flehmen. The difference in body movements give cues to gauge if the male is interested in breeding with the female that produced the secretion. A bull that is ready to breed will move closer to the urine and in some cases an erection response is elicited. A bull that is not ready to breed will be timid and try to dissociate themselves from the signal.

In addition to reproductive communication, chemosensory signaling is used to facilitate same-sex interactions. When less developed males detect pheromones from a male in musth, they often retreat to avoid coming in contact with aggressive behaviors. Female elephants have also been seen to communicate with each other through pheromone in urine. The purpose of this type of intersex communication is still being investigated. However, there are clear differences in signaling strength and receiver response throughout different stages of the estrous cycle.

The gestation period is 18–22 months, and the cow gives birth to one calf, only occasionally twins. The calf is fully developed by the 19th month, but stays in the womb to grow so that it can reach its mother to feed. Once a female gives birth, she usually does not breed again until the first calf is weaned, resulting in a four to five-year birth interval. During this period, mother to calf communication primarily takes place through temporal means. However, male calves have been known to develop sex pheromone producing organs at a young age. Early maturity of the vomeronasal organ allows immature elephants to produce and receive pheromones. It is unlikely that the integration of these pheromones will result in a flehmen response in a calf. Females stay on with the herd, but mature males are chased away.

Asian elephants reach adulthood at 17 years of age in both sexes. Average elephant life expectancy is 60 years in the wild and 80 in captivity, although this has been exaggerated in the past. Generation length of the Asian elephant is 22 years.

Threats
The pre-eminent threats to the Asian elephant today are the loss, degradation and fragmentation of its habitat, which leads to increasing conflicts between humans and elephants. Asian elephants are poached for ivory and a variety of other products including meat and leather. The demand for elephant skin has risen due to it being an increasingly-common ingredient in traditional Chinese medicine.

Human–elephant conflict 

One of the major instigators of human–wildlife conflict in general is competition for space. This is especially true for wild Asian elephants, which require relatively large territories to live in. Destruction of forests through logging, encroachment, slash-and-burn, shifting cultivation, and monoculture tree plantations are major threats to the survival of elephants. Human–elephant conflicts occur when elephants raid crops of shifting cultivators in fields, which are scattered over a large area interspersed with forests. Depredation in human settlements is another major area of human–elephant conflict occurring in small forest pockets, encroachments into elephant habitat, and on elephant migration routes. However, studies in Sri Lanka indicate that traditional slash-and-burn agriculture may create optimal habitat for elephants by creating a mosaic of successional-stage vegetation. Populations inhabiting small habitat fragments are much more liable to come into conflict with humans.

Human-elephant conflict can be categorised into:
 ultimate causes including growing human population, large-scale development projects and poor top-down governance;
 proximate causes including habitat loss due to deforestation, disruption of elephant migratory routes, expansion of agriculture and illegal encroachment into protected areas.

Development such as border fencing along the India–Bangladesh border has become a major impediment to the free movement of elephants. In Assam, more than 1,150 humans and 370 elephants died as a result of human-elephant conflict between 1980 and 2003. In India alone, over 400 people are killed by elephants every year, and 0.8 to 1 million hectares are damaged, affecting at least 500,000 families across the country. Moreover, elephants are known to destroy crops worth up to US$2–3 million annually. This has major impacts on the welfare and livelihoods of local communities, as well as the future conservation of this species. In countries like Bangladesh and Sri Lanka, the Asian elephant is one of the most feared wild animals, even though they are less deadly than other local animals such as venomous snakes (which were estimated to claim more than 30 times more lives in Sri Lanka than elephants). As a whole, Asian elephants display highly sophisticated and sometimes unpredictable behaviour. Most untamed elephants try to avoid humans, but if they are caught off guard by any perceived physical threat, including humans, they will likely charge. This is especially true of males in musth and of females with young. Gunfire and other similar methods of deterring, which are known to be effective against many kinds of wild animals including tigers, may or may not work with elephants, and can even worsen the situation. Elephants that have been abused by humans in the past often become "rogue elephants", which regularly attack people with no provocation.

Poaching

For ivory

The demand for ivory during the 1970s and 1980s, particularly in East Asia, led to rampant poaching and the serious decline of elephants in both Africa and Asia. In Thailand, the illegal trade in live elephants and ivory still flourishes. Although the amount of ivory being openly sold has decreased substantially since 2001, Thailand still has one of the largest and most active black markets for ivory seen anywhere in the world. Tusks from Thai poached elephants also enter the market; between 1992 and 1997 at least 24 male elephants were killed for their tusks.

Up to the early 1990s, Vietnamese ivory craftsmen used exclusively Asian elephant ivory from Vietnam and neighbouring Lao and Cambodia. Before 1990, there were few tourists and the low demand for worked ivory could be supplied by domestic elephants. Economic liberalisation and an increase in tourism raised both local and visitors' demands for worked ivory, which resulted in heavy poaching.

For skin
The skin of the Asian elephant is used as an ingredient in Chinese medicine as well as in the manufacture of ornamental beads. The practice has been aided by China's State Forestry Administration (SFA), which has issued licences for the manufacture and sale of pharmaceutical products containing elephant skin, thereby making trading legal. In 2010, four skinned elephants were found in a forest in Myanmar; 26 elephants were killed by poachers in 2013 and 61 in 2016. According to the NGO Elephant Family, Myanmar is the main source of elephant skin, where a poaching crisis has developed rapidly since 2010.

Handling methods 
Young elephants are captured and illegally imported to Thailand from Myanmar for use in the tourism industry; calves are used mainly in amusement parks and are trained to perform various stunts for tourists.

The calves are often subjected to a 'breaking in' process, which may involve being tied up, confined, starved, beaten and tortured; as a result, two-thirds may perish. Handlers use a technique known as the training crush, in which "handlers use sleep-deprivation, hunger, and thirst to "break" the elephants' spirit and make them submissive to their owners"; moreover, handlers drive nails into the elephants' ears and feet.

Disease
See Elephant endotheliotropic herpesvirus.

Conservation 
The Asian elephant is listed on CITES Appendix I. It is a quintessential flagship species, deployed to catalyze a range of conservation goals, including habitat conservation at landscape scales, generating public awareness on conservation issues, and mobilisation as a popular cultural icon both in India and the West. A key aspect of Asian elephant conservation is connectivity, and preserving the preferred movement routes of elephants through areas of high vegetation cover and with "low human population density".

The World Elephant Day is celebrated on 12 August since 2012. Events are organized to divulge information and to engage people about the problems that the Asian elephant is facing. August has been established as the Asian Elephant Awareness Month by zoos and conservation partners in the United States.

In China, Asian elephants are under first-level protection. Yunnan province has 11 national and regional nature reserves. In 2020, the population of Asian elephants in Yunnan was estimated at around 300 individuals. As conflicts between humans and wild elephants have emerged around protected areas in the last years,  the prefecture of Xishuangbanna built food bases and planted bananas and bamboo to create a better habitat.

In Thailand, Salakpra Wildlife Sanctuary and Tham Than Lot National Park are protected areas hosting around 250–300 elephants, according to figures from 2013. In recent years the National Park has faced issues due to encroachment and over-exploitation.

In India, the National Board of Wildlife did a recommendation, allowing coal mining in the Dehing Patkai elephant reserve in April 2020. The decision raised concerns between students and environmental activists who launched an online campaign to stop the project.

In captivity 

About half of the global zoo elephant population is kept in European zoos, where they have about half the median life span of conspecifics in protected populations in range countries. This discrepancy is clearest in Asian elephants: infant mortality is twice that seen in Burmese timber camps, and adult survivorship in zoos has not improved significantly in recent years. One risk factor for Asian zoo elephants is being moved between institutions, with early removal from the mother tending to have additional adverse effects. Another risk factor is being born into a zoo rather than being imported from the wild, with poor adult survivorship in zoo-born Asians apparently being conferred prenatally or in early infancy. Likely causes for compromised survivorship is stress and/or obesity. Foot problems are commonly observed in captives elephants. These are related to lack of exercise, long hours standing on hard substrates, and contamination resulting from standing in their dung. Many of the problems are treatable. However, mistreatment may lead to serious disability or death.

Demographic analysis of captive Asian elephants in North America indicates that the population is not self-sustaining. First year mortality is nearly 30 per cent, and fecundity is extremely low throughout the prime reproductive years. Data from North American and European regional studbooks from 1962 to 2006 were analysed for deviation of the birth and juvenile death sex ratio. Of 349 captive calves born, 142 died prematurely. They died within one month of birth, major causes being stillbirth and infanticide by either the calf's mother or by one of the exhibition mates. The sex ratio of stillbirths in Europe was found to have a tendency for excess of males.

In culture 

Bones of Asian elephants excavated at Mohenjo-daro in the Indus Valley indicate that they were tamed in the Indus Valley civilization and used for work. Decorated elephants are also depicted on seals and were modelled in clay.

The Asian elephant became a siege engine, a mount in war, a status symbol, a beast of burden, and an elevated platform for hunting during historical times in South Asia.

Asian elephants have been captured from the wild and tamed for use by humans. Their ability to work under instruction makes them particularly useful for carrying heavy objects. They have been used particularly for timber-carrying in jungle areas. Other than their work use, they have been used in war, in ceremonies, and for carriage. It is reported that war elephants are still in use by the Kachin Independence Army (KIA) to take control of Kachin State in northern Myanmar from Myanmar's military. The KIA use about four dozen elephants to carry supplies.

The Asian elephant plays an important part in the culture of the subcontinent and beyond, being featured prominently in the Panchatantra fables and the Buddhist Jataka tales. They play a major role in Hinduism: the god Ganesha's head is that of an elephant, and the "blessings" of a temple elephant are highly valued. Elephants are frequently used in processions where the animals are adorned with festive outfits.

The Asian elephant is depicted in several Indian manuscripts and treatises. Notable amongst these is the Matanga Lila (elephant sport) of Nilakantha. The manuscript Hastividyarnava is from Assam in northeast India.

In the Burmese, Thai and Sinhalese animal and planetary zodiac, the Asian elephant, both tusked and tuskless, are the fourth and fifth animal zodiacs of the Burmese, the fourth animal zodiac of the Thai, and the second animal zodiac of the Sinhalese people of Sri Lanka. Similarly, the elephant is the twelfth animal zodiac in the Dai animal zodiac of the Dai people in southern China.

See also
 Elephants in Thailand
 Endangered species
 Ivory trade
 Khedda
 List of individual elephants
 Mela shikar
 War elephant
 White elephant

References

Further reading
 Gilchrist, W. (1851) A Practical Treatise on the Treatment of the Diseases of the Elephant, Camel & Horned Cattle: with instructions for improving their efficiency; also, a description of the medicines used in the treatment of their diseases; and a general outline of their anatomy. Calcutta: Military Orphan Press

Williamson, J.H.  (1950).  Elephant Bill.

External links

 Save Elephant Foundation
 International Elephant Foundation
 ElefantAsia: Protecting the Asian elephant
 Asian Elephants at the Zoological Gardens of the World
 Elephant Information Repository
 WWF—Asian elephant species profile
 National Zoo Facts on Asian Elephant and a Webcam of the Asian Elephant exhibit
 Environmental Investigation Agency: Illegal Wildlife Trade : Elephants

Elephants
Mammals of Asia
Fauna of South Asia
Fauna of Southeast Asia
EDGE species
Herbivorous mammals
National symbols of Laos
Extant Pliocene first appearances
Pliocene mammals of Asia
Quaternary animals of Asia
Mammals described in 1758
Taxa named by Carl Linnaeus
Endangered animals
Endangered biota of Asia
Species endangered by habitat fragmentation
Species endangered by habitat loss